Euthenics is the study of improvement of human functioning and well-being by improvement of living conditions. "Improvement" is conducted by altering external factors such as education and the controllable environments, including environmentalism, education regarding employment, home economics, sanitation, and housing, as well as the prevention and removal of contagious disease and parasites.

In a New York Times article of May 23, 1926, Rose Field notes of the description, "the simplest [is] efficient living". It is also described as a right to environment.

The Flynn effect has been often cited as an example of euthenics. Another example is the steady increase in body size in industrialized countries since the beginning of the 20th century.

Euthenics is not normally interpreted to have anything to do with changing the composition of the human gene pool by definition, although everything that affects society has some effect on who reproduces and who does not.

Etymology

The term was derived in the late 19th century from the Greek verb eutheneo, εὐθηνέω (eu, well; the, root of τίθημι tithemi, to cause). (To be in a flourishing state, to abound in, to prosper.—Demosthenes. To be strong or vigorous.—Herodotus. To be vigorous in body.—Aristotle.)

Also from the Greek Euthenia, Εὐθηνία. Good state of the body: prosperity, good fortune, abundance.—Herodotus.

The opposite of Euthenia is Penia, Πενία ("deficiency" or "poverty") the personification of poverty and need.

History
Ellen Swallow Richards (Born in 1842–died in 1911; Vassar Class of '70) was one of the first writers to use the term, in The Cost of Shelter (1905), with the meaning "the science of better living". It is unclear if (and probably unlikely that) any of the study programs of euthenics ever completely embraced Richards' multidisciplinary concept, though several nuances remain today, especially that of interdisciplinarity.

Vassar College Institute of Euthenics

After Richards' death in 1911, Julia Lathrop (1858–1932; VC '80) continued to promote the development of an interdisciplinary program in euthenics at the college.  Lathrop soon teamed with alumna Minnie Cumnock Blodgett (1862–1931; VC '84), who with her husband, John Wood Blodgett, offered financial support to create a program of euthenics at Vassar College. Curriculum planning, suggested by Vassar president Henry Noble MacCracken in 1922, began in earnest by 1923, under the direction of Professor Annie Louise Macleod (Chemistry; First woman PhD, McGill University, 1910).

According to Vassar's chronology entry for March 17, 1924, "the faculty recognized euthenics as a satisfactory field for sequential study (major). A Division of Euthenics was authorized to offer a multidisciplinary program [radical at the time] focusing the techniques and disciplines of the arts, sciences and social sciences on the life experiences and relationships of women. Students in euthenics could take courses in horticulture, food chemistry, sociology and statistics, education, child study, economics, economic geography, physiology, hygiene, public health, psychology and domestic architecture and furniture. With the new division came the first major in child study at an American liberal arts college."

For example, a typical major in child study in euthenics includes introductory psychology, laboratory psychology, applied psychology, child study and social psychology in the Department of Psychology; the three courses offered in the Department of Child Study; beginning economics, programs of social reorganization and the family in Economics; and in the Department of Physiology, human physiology, child hygiene, principles of public health.

The Vassar Summer Institute of Euthenics accepted its first students in June 1926. Created to supplement the controversial euthenics major which began February 21, 1925, it was also located in the new Minnie Cumnock Blodgett Hall of Euthenics (York & Sawyer, architects; ground broke October 25, 1925). Some Vassar faculty members (perhaps emotionally upset with being displaced on campus to make way, or otherwise politically motivated) contentiously "believed the entire concept of euthenics was vague and counter-productive to women's progress."

Having overcome a lukewarm reception, Vassar College officially opened its Minnie Cumnock Blodgett Hall of Euthenics in 1929. Dr. Ruth Wheeler (Physiology and Nutrition – VC '99) took over as director of euthenics studies in 1924. Wheeler remained director until Mary Shattuck Fisher Langmuir (VC '20) succeeded her in 1944, until 1951.

The college continued for the 1934–35 academic year its successful cooperative housing experiment in three residence halls.  Intended to help students meet their college costs by working in their residences. For example, in Main, students earned $40 a year by doing relatively light work such as cleaning their rooms.

In 1951, Katharine Blodgett Hadley (VC '20) donated $400,000, through the Rubicon Foundation, to Vassar to help fund operating deficits in the current and succeeding years and to improve faculty salaries.

"Discontinued for financial reasons, the Vassar Summer Institute for Family and Community Living, founded in 1926 as the Vassar Summer Institute of Euthenics, held its last session, July 2, 1958.  This was the first and last session for the institute's new director, Dr. Mervin Freedman."

Elmira College
Elmira College is noted as the oldest college still in existence which (as a college for women) granted degrees to women which were the equivalent of those given to men (the first to do so was the now-defunct Mary Sharp College). Elmira College became coeducational in all of its programs in 1969.

A special article was written in the December 12, 1937 The New York Times, quoting recent graduates of Elmira College, urging for courses in colleges for men on the care of children. Reporting that "preparation for the greatest of all professions, that of motherhood and child-training, is being given the students at Elmira College in the Nursery School which is Conducted as part of the Department of Euthenics."

Elmira College was one of the first of the liberal arts colleges to recognize the fact that women should have some special training, integrated with the so-called liberal studies, which would prepare them to carry on, with less effort and fewer mistakes, a successful family life. Courses in nutrition, household economics, clothing selection, principles of foods and meal planning, child psychology, and education in family relations are a part of the curriculum.

The Elmira College nursery school for fifteen children between the ages of two and five years was opened primarily as a laboratory for college students, but it had become so popular with parents in the community that there was always a long waiting list.

The New York Times article notes how the nursery had become one of the essential laboratories of the college, where recent mothers testified to the value of the training they received while in college. "Today," one graduate said, "when it is often necessary for young women to continue professional work outside the home after marriage, it is important that young fathers, who must share in the actual care and training of the children, should have some knowledge of correct methods."

Today
Many factors led to the movement never getting the funding it needed to remain relevant, including: vigorous debate about the exact meaning of euthenics, a strong antifeminism movement paralleling even stronger women's rights movements, confusion with the term eugenics, the economic impact of the Great Depression and two world wars. These factors also prevented the discipline from gaining the attention it needed to put together a lasting, vastly multidisciplinary curriculum. Therefore, it split off into separate disciplines. Child Study is one such curriculum.

Martin Heggestad of the Mann Library notes that "Starting around 1920, however, home economists tended to move into other fields, such as nutrition and textiles, that offered more career opportunities, while health issues were dealt with more in the hard sciences and in the professions of nursing and public health. Also, improvements in public sanitation (for example, the wider availability of sewage systems and of food inspection) led to a decline in infectious diseases and thus a decreasing need for the largely household-based measures taught by home economists." Thus, the end of euthenics as originally defined by Ellen Swallow Richards ensued.

Relationship with eugenics
According to Ellen Richards, in her book Euthenics: the science of controllable environment (1910):

Debate, misconceptions and opposition

Debate over misconceptions about the movement started almost from the beginning. In his comparison "Eugenics, Euthenics, And Eudemics", (American Journal of Sociology, Vol. 18, No. 6, May 1913), Lester F. Ward of Brown University opens the second section regarding euthenics lamenting: 

Ward later noted about the organic environment that:

Vassar historians note that "critics faulted the new program as a weakening of science and a slide into vocationalism.  The influential educator and historian of education, Abraham Flexner—one of the founders of the Princeton Institute for Advanced Study—attacked the program, along with other "ad hoc" innovations like intercollegiate athletics and student governments, in Universities, American, English, German (1930)."

In the summer of 1926, Margaret Sanger created a stir when she gave a radio address, called "Racial Betterment", in the first Euthenics Institute, where she praised attempts to "close our gates to the so-called 'undesirables'" and proposed efforts to "discourage or cut down on the rapid multiplication of the unfit and undesirable at home", by government-subsidized voluntary sterilization.  (from The Selected Papers of Margaret Sanger, vol. 1 (2003), Esther Katz, ed.)

Eugenicist, Charles Benedict Davenport, noted in his article "Euthenics and Eugenics," found reprinted in the Popular Science Monthly of January 1911, page 18, 20:

In a New York Times op-ed dated October 24, 1926, entitled "Eugenics and euthenics", in response to an op-ed entitled "Bright Children Who Fail" which appeared the previous October 15, student of child psychology, Joseph A. Krisses observes:

Quotations

See also

References

Further reading
Chronologically listed

 
Adapted from

External links 

"Euthenics" search query OCLC - WorldCat 

 
Hygiene
Public health
Standard of living
Quality of life
Sanitation
Well-being